The Guatemala Fed Cup team represents Guatemala in Fed Cup tennis competition and are governed by the Federación Nactional de Tenis de Guatemala.  

They currently compete in the Americas Zone Group II.

History
Guatemala competed in its first Fed Cup in 1992.  Their best result was finishing fifth in Group II in 2007.

See also
Fed Cup
Guatemala Davis Cup team

External links

Billie Jean King Cup teams
Fed Cup
Fed Cup